The Three Principles of Mind, Consciousness and Thought were first articulated by Sydney Banks, a 9th-grade educated welder, born in Scotland, living in British Columbia, Canada in the early 1970s. 

The related page Health Realization (as it was previously known) has comprehensive background information, details of community application, references, peer-reviewed articles and external links. Information provided here is limited.

Discovery of the Three Principles 
According to Banks' verbal accounts, as recorded at lectures, he realised the three principles while attending a marriage seminar held on Cortes Island, in British Columbia, Canada.

The seminar encouraged couples to "let their feelings out," be honest, and argue with one another. Discouraged with the process, Banks and his wife prepared to leave the seminar. As they were doing so, Banks became engaged in conversation with a therapist also attending the seminar.

Describing himself as "an insecure mess" at that time, Banks began elaborating on all the ways in which he felt insecure. The therapist's response, "I've never heard such nonsense in all my life", was a revelation to Banks.
What I heard was: there’s no such thing as insecurity, it’s only Thought. All my insecurity was only my own thoughts! It was like a bomb going off in my head … It was so enlightening! It was unbelievable … [And after that,] there was such beauty coming into my life.

The three specific terms, Mind, Consciousness and Thought, were not clearly delineated during Banks' initial experience. The three words, and his definitions, would become clear later through his talks and lectures. Referring to them as "the psychological trinity", Banks does not take credit for finding the Principles, rather the Principles found him.

Application 
Roughly 40 years later, Syd Banks' "insight" has been introduced in hospitals and hospital systems, correctional institutions, social services, community housing, drug and alcohol prevention and treatment programmes, schools, and multi-national corporations.

Application of the Three Principles of Mind, Consciousness and Thought has spread throughout the United States, and into Canada, Sweden, Norway, Denmark, Israel, Scotland, England, South Africa, New Zealand, Australia and Spain.

Definition 
According to Banks, the three "formless" principles of Mind, Consciousness and Thought explain the entire range of human behaviour and feeling states. They are responsible for the creation of all human experience.

The three principles are defined as:

Mind 
The energy and intelligence of all life, whether in the form, or formless. The Universal Mind, the impersonal mind, or “wisdom” is constant and unchangeable. The personal mind is in a perpetual state of change.

 Consciousness Consciousness is the gift of awareness. Consciousness allows the recognition of form, form being an expression of Thought.

 Thought 
The power of Thought'' is not self-created. Thought is a divine gift, which serves you immediately after you are born. Thought is the creative agent we use to direct us through life.

Three Principles movement 
The Three Principles have become the basis of a growing, international psycho-spiritual movement with centers in the United States and Europe. The fundamental premise of the movement is that life is spiritually generated into form from formless energy, and that our experience as human beings is created from the interaction of the Three Principles; including the experience of self-identity.

Practitioners of the Three Principles believe that feeling states (and all mental states) are self-created (through mental activity i.e., thought). Scientific research by Lisa Feldman Barrett supports this notion that mental states (ie. emotions) are indeed constructed from within the human mind. Practitioners believe that beyond each person's limited, conscious, and personal thought system lies a vast reservoir of wisdom, insight and spiritual intelligence. No one person has greater access to spiritual wisdom than any other. Mental health is the resting state, or "default" setting of the mind, which brings with it non-contingent feelings of love, compassion, resilience, creativity and unity; both with others and with life itself. Research by George Bonnano,  professor of clinical psychology at Columbia University, supports this notion that resilience, not recovery is a common response to difficult life events such as trauma and loss.

It would be difficult to provide a comprehensive list of centers worldwide that are dedicated to sharing the Three Principles. However, some prominent organizations are the Center for Sustainable Change, Three Principles Foundation, Three Principles Movies, and The Cypress Initiative.

Founder and students 
Banks, who died of metastasized cancer on Memorial Day, in May 2009, contradicted many traditional notions and practices of psychotherapy. Specifically, that for mental wellbeing, it was not important to process the past, nor that the content of peoples' personal thought systems had to be "worked with" and analysed.

Everyone in mental institutions is sitting in the middle of mental health and they don't know it.

Banks was also averse to using techniques, or creating concepts, in order to share with others. These, he felt, contradicted the essential formless and original nature of the Three Principles, which emphasises kindness, "sharing, caring" and the simple gift of love.

A number of therapists and psychologists showed an interest in the concepts, and the teachings were spread into various private practices, social services, corporate training and consulting, psychiatry, education, community mental health and development work, and drug and alcohol treatment systems.

Other names 
The Three Principles have been called by other names, including The Inside out Understanding, Health Realization, neo-cognitive psychology, Psychology of Mind, and Innate Health. The form of how the Three Principles has been taught has changed over the decades, with an increasing emphasis on simplicity, formlessness, and speaking from the heart. Some would say that the Three Principles is not a "technique" that can be taught but instead a paradigm that comes to be understood at increasingly deeper levels.

Bibliography 
Works by Sydney Banks, currently published by Lone Pine Publishing, Edmonton, Alberta, Canada

Books 
 Dear Liza, 2004
 The Enlightened Gardener
 The Enlightened Gardener Revisited
 In Quest of the Pearl
 The Missing Link: Reflections on Philosophy and Spirit
 Second Chance

Audio 
 Attitude! — CD
 Great Spirit, The — CD & Audio Cassette
 Hawaii Lectures - 2-CD set
 In Quest of the Pearl — CD
 Long Beach Lectures - 2-CD set
 One Thought Away — CD (CD-Audio)
 Second Chance — CD & Audio Cassette
 Washington Lectures - CD
 What is Truth? — CD & Audio Cassette

Video 
 Hawaii Lecture #1 - Secret to the Mind — DVD
 Hawaii Lecture #2 - Oneness of Life — DVD & VHS
 Hawaii Lecture #3 - The Power of Thought — DVD & VHS
 Hawaii Lecture #4 - Going Home — DVD & VHS
 Long Beach Lecture #1 - The Great Illusion — DVD
 Long Beach Lecture #2 - Truth Lies Within — DVD & VHS
 Long Beach Lecture #3 - The Experience — DVD & VHS
 Long Beach Lecture #4 - Jumping the Boundaries of Time — DVD & VHS
 Long Beach Lectures - 4 video set — VHS

By other authors

References

External links
 Three Principles Global Community
 Center for Sustainable Change
 The Three Principles Conference
 Three Principles Foundation
 Three Principles Movies
 The Cypress Initiative 

Psychological theories